WRBF is a radio station airing a classic rock format licensed to Plainville, Georgia, broadcasting on 104.9 MHz FM.  The station serves the areas of Rome, Georgia and Calhoun, Georgia, and is owned by Howard C. Toole.

References

External links
WRBF's official website

Classic rock radio stations in the United States
RBF